District 15 of the Oregon State Senate comprises central Washington County, including most of Hillsboro as well as Forest Grove, Cornelius, and North Plains. It is currently represented by Democrat Janeen Sollman of Hillsboro.

Election results
District boundaries have changed over time, therefore, senators before 2013 may not represent the same constituency as today. From 1993 until 2003, the district covered parts of the northern Willamette Valley, and from 2003 until 2013 it covered a slightly different area in Washington County.

References

15
Washington County, Oregon